Leo, Gerry and Myles Fitzgerald (born August 26, 1993) are Canadian former child actors and current ice hockey players best known for their joint roles as Sylvester (Sly) and Whit in the 1999 film, Baby Geniuses. They also appeared in the sequel, Superbabies: Baby Geniuses 2, in 2004.

They are forwards who formerly played minor hockey in Port Alberni, British Columbia, followed by their junior B in the Vancouver Island Junior Hockey League.  They were then reunited in the British Columbia Hockey League (BCHL) with the Nanaimo Clippers, Prince George Spruce Kings, and Victoria Grizzlies. After the triplets led the Grizzlies in scoring in the 2012-13 season, Leo, Gerry and Myles Fitzgerald all committed and played collegiate hockey at Bemidji State University from the 2014-15 to the 2017-2018 season. Leo played 3 games for the South Carolina Stingrays of the ECHL at the end of the 2017-2018 season and played for Ferencvárosi TC in the 2018-2019 season, which played in the OB I bajnokság and in the MOL Liga. Gerry played 16 games for the Iowa Wild of the AHL at the end of the 2017-2018 season. He signed for the 2018-2019 season, his first full season with the team. Myles played for Ferencvárosi TC in the 2018-2019 season (with Leo) and the 2019-2020 season, during which he also played for the Ravensburg Towerstars and the Bietigheim Steelers, before playing for ECDC Memmingen for the 2020-2021 season.

Filmography

References

External links

Canadian male child actors
Male actors from British Columbia
People from Port Alberni
Triplets
Living people
1993 births
Irish-Canadian families
Bemidji State University alumni